Blàr nam Fèinne (Battlefield of the Fingalians) on Cnoc na Moine (Hill of the Peat) in The Aird, to the west of Inverness, is the site of the 11th century battle between Scottish forces led by Malcolm III of Scotland against Norwegian forces led by Thorfinn. 

The site is also traditionally believed to be the location at which Domhnall Ballach, leader of Clan Donald, and his forces were defeated in the 15th century.

References

http://canmore.rcahms.gov.uk/en/site/12728/details/blar+nam+feinne/

Battles involving Scotland
History of the Scottish Highlands
11th-century conflicts
11th century in Scotland